The article contains information about the 2020–21 Iran 3rd Division football season. This is the 4th rated football league in Iran after the Persian Gulf Cup, Azadegan League, and 2nd Division. The league started on 5 December 2020.

In total 85 teams (65 teams in the first stage in 5 groups, 20 teams in second stage) competed in this season's competitions.

The challenges caused by COVID-19 pandemic in Iran made some calendar changes in previous season's final matches. Therefore, this season started later than usual time.

First stage
The top 2 teams from each group advance to the Second Stage. The teams ranked 3rd, 4th and 5th in each group (total 15 teams) are eligible to play in the First Round of next season. The teams ranked 6th and lower relegate to Provincial Leagues.

Qualified teams
Teams which are eligible to play in this round are as follows:

Relegated from 2nd Division (1 team):

Relegated from 3rd Division – 2nd Stage (6 teams):

Remaining from 3rd Division – 1st Stage (18 teams):

Promoted from Provincial Leagues (34 teams):

Free slots (6 teams):

Group A

Group B

Group C

Group D

Group E

Second stage

Second Stage started in April 2021 and finished on August 10th 2021.

Qualified teams
Relegated from 2nd Division (3 teams):

Remaining teams from last season (17 teams):

Promoted from 1st Stage (10 teams):

Group 1

Group 2

Group 3

Ranking of third-placed teams

Ranking of seventh-placed teams 

<onlyinclude>

Play-offs
The draw of the play-off round held on August 14, 2021, between following teams.

Qualified teams
2nd placed teams in Second Stage (3 teams):
 Omid Vahdat Birjand
 Artam Tabriz
 Khalij Fars Mahshahr
Best 3rd placed team in Second Stage (1 team):
 Shohadaye Razakan Karaj

First round

Omid Vahdat Birjand won 1–0 on aggregate and promoted to second play-off round.

Shohadaye Razakan Karaj won 4–3 on aggregate and promoted to second play-off round.

Second round

Shohadaye Razakan Karaj won 3–0 on aggregate and promoted to 2021-22 Iran Football's 2nd Division.

References 

League 3 (Iran) seasons
4